A list of reference works on the horror genre of film.

Books

Raphael, Raphael; Siddique, Sophia, eds. (2017). Transnational Horror Cinema: Bodies of Excess and the Global Grotesque. Palgrave Macmillan. .

Bibliographies of film